The 1950–51 season was Fussball Club Basel 1893's 57th season in their existence. It was their fifth season in Nationalliga A the top flight of Swiss football following their promotion from the Nationalliga B in the season 1945–46. For the second consecutive season Basel played their home games in the Stadion Schützenmatte in the Bachletten quartier in the southwestern edge of the city of Basel. Jules Düblin was the club's chairman for the fifth successive season.

Overview 
Ernst Hufschmid, who had functioned as player-coach the previous three seasons, continued in this function this year. Curiosity, Hufschmid played only in one match this season and it was his last active match as player and this he played as goalkeeper. On 10 August 1950 Football Club Basel played against Eishockey Club Basel. This was a return game for the ice hockey game EHC-FCB in December 1949. The football team won the football match 14–5. Goalkeeper Walter Müller played as striker and he scored six goals.

Basel played a total of 40 games in this season. Of these 26 games were in the domestic league, three games were in the Swiss Cup and eleven were test games. The test games resulted with eight victories, one was drawn and two ended with defeats. In total, including the test games and the cup competition, they won 22 games, drew five and lost 13 times. In the 41 games they scored 106 goals and conceded 75.

As in the previous seasons, there were fourteen teams contesting in the 1950–51 Nationalliga A and the bottom two teams in the table to be relegated. Basel played a mediocre season and throughout the season they were in the midfield of the table. At the end of the season Basel won their last two games and finished in fourth position level on points with Zürich and Servette, six points behind the new champions Lausanne-Sport. Basel won 12 games, drew four and were defeated ten times, they scored 62 goals and conceded 51 as they gained their 28 points. Josef "Seppe" Hügi was the team's best scorer and 2nd best league scorer. He netted 21 league goals. Paul Stöcklin was the team's second best goal getter and 12th best league scorer with 12 goals.

In the 3rd principal round of the Swiss Cup on 29 October 1950 in the away match against FC Münchenstein Gottlieb Stäuble had a good day and scored a hat-trick as the team won 6–0 to qualify for the next round. In round 4 Basel were drawn away against Biel-Bienne and this too was won. In round 5 Basel were drawn at home against Locarno. In the 65th minute goalkeeper Walter Müller and defender Werner Wenk were both sent off and Locarno won the game. Locarno later advanced to the final, but here were defeated by La Chaux-de-Fonds who thus won the trophy.

Players 
The following is the list of the Basel first team squad during the season 1950–51. The list includes players that were in the squad on the day that the Nationalliga A season started on 3 September 1950 but subsequently left the club after that date.

 
 
 

 
 

 

 

Players who left the squad

Results

Legend

Friendly matches

Pre-season

Winter break to end of season

Nationalliga

League matches

League standings

Swiss Cup

See also
 History of FC Basel
 List of FC Basel players
 List of FC Basel seasons

References

Sources 
 Rotblau: Jahrbuch Saison 2014/2015. Publisher: FC Basel Marketing AG. 
 Die ersten 125 Jahre. Publisher: Josef Zindel im Friedrich Reinhardt Verlag, Basel. 
 The FCB team 1950–51 at fcb-archiv.ch
 Switzerland 1950–51 by Erik Garin at Rec.Sport.Soccer Statistics Foundation

External links
 FC Basel official site

FC Basel seasons
Basel